The South Wales Metro is an integrated heavy rail, light rail and bus-based public transport services and systems network in South East Wales around the hub of . The first phase was approved for development in October 2013. Works are currently underway with a brand new depot under construction at Taff's Well and new trains being constructed at the Construcciones y Auxiliar de Ferrocarriles (CAF)  factory in Newport. This will also include the electrification of the core Valley Lines and new stations. This will be the biggest overhaul to the railways of South Wales since their construction 170 years ago.

Background
The rail-based transport system in South Wales was degraded due to the 1960s Beeching cuts. This saw the closure of some lines and many sub-branches serving the mainly ex-mining communities and their easy links to ports and resorts on the coast. Since 1987, five of the main closures have been reversed: services were reinstated on Cardiff's City Line that year, the Aberdare Line the next year, the Maesteg Line in 1992, the Vale of Glamorgan Line between Barry and Bridgend in 2005, and the Ebbw Vale Line in 2008.

Development
In February 2011, Cardiff Business Partnership (CBP) and the Institute of Welsh Affairs published a report by Professor Mark Barry of Cardiff University, calling for an investment of £2.5billion over 10years to connect Cardiff, Newport and the South Wales Valleys. The report concluded that with the stated investment in a regional metro system, by 2025 it would be possible to travel from the Heads of the Valleys to Cardiff or Newport in 40minutes, by combining electrified heavy rail and light rail systems and boosted by faster rail links to London and Heathrow Airport.

After internal consultation, this was submitted by CBP to the Welsh Government's Business Minister Edwina Hart in December 2012.

From Autumn 2012, Barry led the private sector Metro Consortium, with the common aim of promoting the South Wales Metro project, which included representatives from Capita, Jones Lang LaSalle, The Urbanists and Steer Davies Gleave. They produced a further interim report, "A Cardiff City Region Metro: transform | regenerate | connect" published in February 2013.
Hart then commissioned Barry to lead a more detailed analysis of the potential benefits: The Metro Impact Study of October 2013. This more substantive report concluded that an initial £1billion investment in an integrated metro transport network for South East Wales could, within 30years, add 420,000 people to the network, create 7,000 new jobs and invest an additional £4billion into the regional economy.

In October 2013, after Barry had submitted his report to Hart at the end of summer 2013, the Business Minister endorsed the report. She allocated £62million for phase one of the scheme to improve bus and rail links, including rail infrastructure improvements, station upgrades, park and ride schemes, bus corridors, and walking and cycling schemes. She also set up a working group to examine detailed proposals for the potential subsequent stages of the Cardiff Capital Region Metro system.

Implementation

Former First Minister Carwyn Jones formally launched the South Wales Metro in November 2015, with the Welsh Government setting out its aspirations for the Metro in its November 2015 publication, "Rolling Out Our Metro".

Procurement for the Metro began in July 2016, as part of the procurement process for the next Wales & Borders franchise. This was managed by Transport for Wales. This concluded in May 2018, with the awarding of the franchise to KeolisAmey Wales, trading as Transport for Wales Rail Services, from 14 October 2018.

Details of the £5billion investment was announced in June 2018 to run all of Wales' rail service over 15 years by two European companies jointly.

In October 2018, £119million of funding was obtained from the European Union to support the modernisation plans. In January 2019, a new report had proposed several new schemes such as a rail link to Abertillery.

In August 2019, it was announced that work on the project would be delayed, due to "unresolved issues" particularly around maintenance cost estimates, which are preventing sale of the freehold land, buildings, and operational assets, by current owner Network Rail to the Welsh Ministers. The deal will require approval from the Office of Rail & Road before contractor KeolisAmey Wales can undertake work including electrification and other improvements. The project faces a deadline of 2022 for some work, as the work will need to meet the deadline for the £159million in awarded European Regional Development funding, which will not be available after that date due to Brexit.

It was announced that the first work on the project would start on 3 August 2020, beginning with track improvements on lines to Merthyr Tydfil, Aberdare and Treherbert. These lines will operate as a rail replacement service between 8pm and 5am until December 2020, except on Fridays and Saturdays. The phase two works are scheduled to be completed by 2023.

Total cost of South Wales metro part 1 has been cited by the Welsh government as £88.5 million in a brochure on the development.

The total cost of South Wales Metro part 2 is estimated to be £738 million that includes "electrification of the CVL; double tracking of selected route sections; a direct connection from the Treherbert, Aberdare and Merthyr Tydfil lines to Cardiff Bay; and a new train stabling facility at Taff’s Well". In addition, £800 million will be invested in rolling stock, bring the phase two total to £1.538 billion.

New fleet
The trainsets will be manufactured by Stadler and delivered by 2023.

Proposed network

Existing rail network

:
Valley Lines:
Northwest to Coryton
North to :
Onwards to 
Onwards to 
Onwards to 
Onwards to 
West via Maesteg Line to Maesteg
South via Vale of Glamorgan Line to:

Bridgend via Rhoose and Llantwit Major
East via Ebbw Vale Line to 
North-east via Welsh Marches Line to Abergavenny
Cardiff Queen Street:
South via Cardiff Bay branch to Cardiff Bay

Current proposals

 Cardiff Bay:
 On-street extension to a relocated Cardiff Bay station
 New intermediate station at Loudoun Square
 Newport:
 North via Ebbw Vale Line to 
 Valley Lines:
 New station at Crwys Road
 New station at Gabalfa
 Relocated Treforest Estate station
 South Wales Main Line
 New station at Cardiff Parkway
 New station at Llanwern

Former proposals 
These routes were planned to be developed as high-speed bus routes or light rail/tram-based services – however, they are not currently part of the Metro plans:

:
South to:
Culverhouse Cross
Porth Teigr
Cardiff:
Cross-route east/west from Coryton to Heath, Cardiff Gate, and then south to a new station at St Mellons
Beddau: connecting:
North-east to Pontypridd
South-east to Cardiff Central
South-west via Llantrisant, Miskin/ to Bridgend
Llantrisant, connecting:
North via  to Maerdy
Pontypridd: connecting:
North-east via Ystrad Mynach, Pontllanfraith, Newbridge to Pontypool
Pontllanfraith: new hub, connecting:
North to Tredegar
Hirwaun:
Cross-valley route via Merthyr Tydfil, Rhymney, Tredegar to Ebbw Vale
Newport:
North via Ebbw Vale Line to Abertillery
West via the former Brecon and Merthyr Tydfil Junction Railway to Treharris, via Pye Corner, Machen, Caerphilly, Ystrad Mynach and Nelson.

See also
Swansea Bay and West Wales Metro
North Wales Metro
Valleys & Cardiff Local Routes
Cardiff Capital Region

References

External links
South Wales Metro webpage

Railway lines in Wales
Tram transport in Wales
Bus transport in Wales
Transport in Cardiff
Transport in Newport, Wales
Bridgend
Transport in Rhondda Cynon Taf